Šašić is a Serbian and Croatian surname. Notable people with the surname include:

Milan Šašić (born 1958), Croatian football manager
Željko Šašić (born 1969), Serbian pop-folk singer.
Célia Šašić (née Okoyino da Mbabi; born 1988), German female footballer

Croatian surnames
Serbian surnames